The Lieberman Plan, also known in Israel as the "Populated-Area Exchange Plan", was proposed in May 2004 by Avigdor Lieberman, the leader of the Israeli political party Yisrael Beiteinu. The plan suggests an exchange of populated territoriesterritories populated by both Arabs and Jewsbetween Israel and the Palestinian Authority.

Lieberman maintains that everywhere in the world where there are two peoples with two religions a conflict exists and notes that in the Israeli–Palestinian conflict, the situation is worse as there is not only a religious conflict but also a nationalistic one. Therefore, the proposition is based on 'reduction of conflict' and maintains that the two peoples could live together but it would make no sense to have one living inside the other. On top of this, Lieberman maintains that it makes no sense to create a Palestinian state that has no Jewish people while Israel is turned into a dual-population state with more than 20% of minorities.

In general, Arab Israelis are opposed to the plan and many believe it constitutes racism. The Israeli left opposes the plan. Legal experts have cast doubt on the legality of such a move under Israeli and international law.

The plan 
The Lieberman Plan suggests a territorial exchange whereby Israel would annex almost all Israeli settlements in the West Bank which are situated in major settlement blocs close to the border, and withdraw from the remaining few deep inside the Palestinian territories. At the same time, it would transfer Arab-Israeli areas to the Palestinian state. While there are three major Arab regions in Israel, all contiguous with the West Bank (southern and central Galilee, the central region known as "the Triangle", and the Bedouin region in the northern part of the Negev desert), the Lieberman Plan only advocates ceding the Triangle. All Arab residents of the Triangle would lose their Israeli citizenship. The Druze community, whose leaders are mainly pro-Israel, would remain part of Israel. All remaining citizens, whether Jews or Arabs would have to pledge an oath of allegiance to the state in order to keep their Israeli citizenship.

The plan would reduce both the Arab population of Israel and the Jewish population of the West Bank, creating more ethnically homogeneous states without anyone moving. Various estimates as to the number of Arab-Israelis affected by the plan vary from a high of 90% of current Arab Israelis in Lieberman's own estimate to as little as 11.8% of Arab citizens being affected (2.3% of Israel's population overall) according to a study by the Floersheimer Institute for Policy Studies.

Lieberman's argument for the plan 
Lieberman's main argument for the plan is that it is not a population transfer, since the plan does not call for any forcible removal of anyone from their home. The plan, instead, simply redraws the border between Palestinian and Israeli communities to make them more homogeneous (i.e., nearby Arab communities are redrawn to be included in the Palestinian Territory, while nearby Jewish territories are redrawn to be included in Israel).

In an open Q&A with Haaretz, Lieberman noted that it is of great importance to have a partner in the Arab side and stated that he communicated his plan to the Palestinians and the Arab states prior to making it public in Israel. Lieberman stated his belief that the Arab world understands that his plan would be in the benefit of the region and cited that there were no denunciations from either the Palestinians or the Arab world to this plan.

Poll of Umm Al-Fahm residents 

A 2000 poll conducted by the Arab-language weekly Kul Al-Arab in Umm Al-Fahm found that an 83% majority opposed having their town transferred to Palestinian rule, with only 11% in favor.

Views of the Islamic Movement 
The deputy leader of the Islamic Movement's northern branch, Sheikh Kamel Khatib, said of the Lieberman plan that the only acceptable population exchange for him would be for the Soviet-born Lieberman to: "return to his country while refugees in Syria and Lebanon return to their homeland".

Feasibility 
According to Timothy Waters, "objections about feasibility ... are really not based on a belief that transfer is impossible, but a conviction that it is undesirable".

The Plan conforms with generalized support both inside and outside of Israel for a two-state solution. Supporters within Israel seek a state that is both democratic and Jewish, the Lieberman Plan would achieve this goal. For those that believe that the ideal solution to the Israel-Arab conflict would be greater separation between Jews and Arabs, this plan would certainly achieve such a goal. The Plan also minimizes the population of the minority in each state, which can be viewed (in the case of either minority) as "untrustworthy, unwanted, destabilizing, disruptive or simply different". Demographically the plan creates two States which are more ethnically homogeneous, and likely would achieve the political goals of both the Palestinian and Israeli leadership. In sum, according to Waters: "It is entirely plausible that the Plan could contribute to peace, if peace could be achieved through a greater separation of Jews and Palestinians. That is, after all, the assumption underlying all two-state solutions."

However, most assumptions about feasibility, including Waters', assume that the Plan would result from a multi-lateral agreement. At the present, there does not seem to be support for it from a willing Palestinian partner, thus decreasing the likelihood that it would be successful in achieving peace.

Legality 
Several issues of legality arise under the Lieberman Plan: the transfer of territory, revoking the citizenship of a people (i.e., the Arabs) – either through transfer of territory or a loyalty oath, and the gaining of new territory (settlement blocs in the West Bank). Timothy Waters writes that the plan can be creatively imagined as a secession – as if Israel was seceding from its present borders to smaller borders where the Jews have a larger majority.

Transfer of territory 
Generally speaking, land transfer, as opposed to population transfer, is legal under both International and Israeli law. The Israeli precedent was exemplified in 1979 when Israel agreed to transfer the Sinai Desert in exchange for peace with Egypt. The issue that arises with this plan is the transfer of populated territories and the revocation of citizenship for those in the transferred areas. Even this, in principle, seems to be legal under international law.

Revocation of citizenship through transfer of territory 
A number of legal experts questioned by The Jerusalem Post in 2006 argued that stripping Israeli Arabs of citizenship as part of a population and territorial swap with the Palestinian Authority would "run counter to Israeli and international law". They stated that Israel could decide that the "Triangle", which is populated mostly by Israeli Arabs, is no longer part of Israel but that she could not revoke the citizenship of the people living there. However, others questioned in the same report, including parliamentary and constitutional law teacher, Suzie Navot, argued that the legality of the plan was unclear, and would likely need a ruling from the High Court of Justice to determine its legality. Yisrael Beiteinus legal adviser Yoav Many believes the plan is legal and "would be accepted not just in Israel but also within the international community".

Timothy Waters writes that the plan, contrary to many arguments, is not an example of ethnic cleansing nor apartheid since it does not move any Arab from their land. He writes that states have the right to transfer (or withdraw from) territory, even against the wishes of the population, or to revoke the citizenship of inhabitants. The Lieberman Plan advocates the affected Arab Israelis to become citizens of Palestine, not stateless, and hence doesn't violate 1961 Convention on the Reduction of Statelessness. Waters also argues that while a state cannot strip an entire ethnic group of their citizenship, it may practice some forms of ethnic discrimination "because ethnicity plays an accepted role in constructing citizenship". He points to the expulsion of black Senegalese from Mauritania, the stripping of northern Muslims of their citizenship by Côte d'Ivoire and the denationalization of Germans from Czechoslovakia (whose legality, he says, was later upheld in courts). Waters also argues that while the transfer of Israeli Arabs to a Palestinian state would harm their interests (e.g. reduction in standard of life) it doesn't violate any of their human rights.

While there are international precedents for the idea of populated land exchange, and international law seems to be favorable, there is no such precedent under Israeli law. Scholars tend to agree that the plan is, at best, questionable under Israeli law. Currently, there is no Israeli law which would deal with this issue. In order for it to be implemented, the Knesset would have to enact legislation, and the High Court of Justice would rule on its legality. It is unlikely that either International or Israeli law would allow revocation of citizenship without a bilateral agreement with the Palestinian Authority.

Revocation of citizenship through a citizenship oath 
Individuals who would prefer to remain in Israel instead of becoming citizens of a Palestinian state would be able to move to Israel. All citizens of Israel would be required to swear a loyalty oath to retain citizenship. Those who refuse could remain in Israel as permanent residents. The loyalty oath would apply to all citizens regardless of ethnicity. According to Timothy Waters "the loyalty oath almost certainly violates international law." The rationale behind this is that international law sees citizenship as an automatic right. Furthermore, those who refused to take the oath would be stateless, unlike those transferred under the population exchange part of the plan.

Annexation of West Bank settlements 
Timothy Waters writes that while Israel does have the right to unilaterally withdraw its borders from Arab territory, it cannot unilaterally take territory in the West Bank (in particular the Israeli settlements there). While it would be legitimate for a sovereign Palestine to transfer territory to Israeli control, Palestine would be under no obligation to do so. Waters bases this on the argument that the West Bank, including East Jerusalem, constitute occupied territory.

Criticism

Moral arguments 
Most criticisms of the plan focus on the undesirability of separation as opposed to its infeasibility. Many Arab citizens of Israel have criticized the plan as being racist and are, in general, opposed to it. While the plan would not require them to leave their homes, Arabs in Israel argue that they are native to the region and insist that as Israeli citizens, they deserve equal rights within the state, and should not be singled out by ethnic or religious background. Various polls show that Arabs in Israel in general do not wish to move to the West Bank or Gaza if a Palestinian state is created there.

Several Israeli left-wing commentators have argued against the plan as well. Jewish critics sympathetic to the idea of exchanging populated territories have argued that it would be preferable to do this as part of a comprehensive peace agreement. They point out that while Arabs under the plan would still be allowed to retain Israeli citizenship if they take an oath of allegiance, no reciprocal possibility exists.

Akiva Eldar of Haaretz has said that the plan undermines the moral high ground of Israel. Haaretz has argued that the plan "is nothing but polite packaging that does not succeed in concealing its real aspiration: delegitimizing all the Arab citizens of Israel".

Daniel Gordis wrote that the plan's implementation would be highly demoralizing to those Arabs who would not be removed and might give them the sense that Israel does not want them. Gordis argued that this could set back any attempt to build better relations with the Israeli-Arab community. However, he acknowledged that they may already believe that Israel doesn't want them and are unlikely to embrace Israel as a Jewish state, and that nothing Israel does will convince them otherwise.

Strategic arguments 
Other pro-Arab commentators have expressed skepticism that such a land-and-population transfer would result in the withdrawal of Israeli settlers and, hence, IDF soldiers, from areas of Israeli residence in the Lieberman-envisioned Palestinian state. Another concern is that Israeli zones within the West Bank would be subject to a security threat, putting the IDF at high risk to defend them.

References 

Demographics of Israel
Israeli–Palestinian peace process
Two-state solution